La rivincita di Natale, internationally released as Christmas Rematch, is a 2004 Italian comedy-drama film directed by Pupi Avati. It is the sequel of the 1986 film Christmas Present.

Plot 
In Bologna, Franco, Lele, Stefano and Ugo, once old friends once, reunite for the Christmas holidays. Franco, who was defeated 18 years before, is now a great industrialist and film producer, and he is going to have the rematch of a poker game played many years ago. Initially, Franco loses many euros, but after a while, he starts winning. At the end of the game his friends leave defeated, and Franco realizes he is left alone because of a game because now he has lost the esteem of his dear comrades.

Cast 
Diego Abatantuono: Franco Mattioli
Gianni Cavina: Ugo Cavara
Alessandro Haber: Gabriele Bagnoli
Carlo Delle Piane: avvocato Santelia
George Eastman: Stefano Bertoni
Petra Khruz: Elisa Delai
Osvaldo Ruggieri: Renato Delai
Eliana Miglio: Mariarosa Boscovich

References

External links

2004 films
2004 comedy-drama films
Italian comedy-drama films
Films directed by Pupi Avati
Films scored by Riz Ortolani
Films about poker
2000s Italian-language films
Italian sequel films
2000s Italian films